Eric Stewart Bishop (30 January 1926 – 1 April 2000) was a sports journalist and play-by-play sports broadcaster. In 1987 Bishop was inducted into the Canadian Football Hall of Fame as a broadcaster.

Bishop was also briefly a horse race owner.

Work experience
Junior sportswriter Vancouver Sun, c. 1944
Royal Canadian Air Force, 1944
catcher Purity 99 Big Four League baseball Calgary, mid 1940s
sportswriter/assistant sports editor Calgary Herald, 1946
PR/broadcaster WIHL Los Angeles Ramblers 1946–47
Sports Director CJAT Trail, British Columbia, 1948
Home Oil Pro Hockey broadcasts CKNW New Westminster, 1952
Sports Director CFAC Calgary, 1954
called horse races Victoria Park Calgary, 1959–64
Sports Editor Calgary Albertan, early 1960s
CKXL (AM) Calgary, late 1960s
part owner WHL Victoria Cougars, 1970s
BC Lions football play-by-play announcer with CKWX, 1970s
play-by-play WHA Calgary Cowboys CFAC Calgary, 1980s
sports columnist Calgary Sun, 1990s

References

External links
 Biography
 Broadcasting history

1926 births
2000 deaths
People from Lacombe, Alberta
Journalists from Alberta
Canadian sportswriters
Canadian male journalists
20th-century Canadian non-fiction writers
20th-century Canadian male writers
Vancouver Sun people
Canadian sports announcers
Canadian Football Hall of Fame inductees
Canadian racehorse owners and breeders
World Hockey Association broadcasters